Gendarmerie Nationale FC, more commonly known as Gendarmerie Nationale or simply Gendarmerie, is a Djiboutian football club located in Djibouti City, Djibouti. It currently plays in the Djibouti Premier League.

Stadium
The club plays at the El Hadj Hassan Gouled Aptidon Stadium, a stadium with a current maximum capacity of 40,000 audience members.

References

External links
Soccerway

Football clubs in Djibouti
Police association football clubs